The Six Days of Buffalo was a six-day cycling event, held in Buffalo, New York. From 1910 to 1948, a total of sixteen editions of the Six Days were held, sometimes two per year.

Originally held at Broadway Auditorium, the events moved to Buffalo Memorial Auditorium beginning in 1941.

Roll of honor

References

1910 establishments in New York (state)
1948 disestablishments in New York (state)
Cycle races in the United States
Defunct cycling races in the United States
International cycle races hosted by the United States
Recurring sporting events established in 1910
Recurring sporting events disestablished in 1948
Six-day races
Sports in Buffalo, New York